The 1934 Xavier Musketeers football team was an American football team that represented Xavier University in the Ohio Athletic Conference (OAC) during the 1934 college football season. The team compiled a 6–2–1 record and outscored opponents by a total of 220 to 55. The team played its home games at Corcoran Field in Cincinnati.

Schedule

References

Xavier
Xavier Musketeers football seasons
Xavier Musketeers football